Brett Dennen is the first studio album by the American musician Brett Dennen. It was released in 2003 by Three Angels and a Saint Records.

Track listing

References

2003 debut albums
Brett Dennen albums